The following were the scheduled events of association football for the year 2017 throughout the world.

Events

Men's national teams 
17 June – 2 July: 2017 FIFA Confederations Cup in 
 : 
 : 
 : 
 4th:

AFC
9 – 16 December: 2017 EAFF E-1 Football Championship in 
 : 
 : 
 : 
 4th:

CAF
14 January – 5 February: 2017 Africa Cup of Nations in 
 : 
 : 
 : 
 4th:

CONCACAF 
13 – 22 January: 2017 Copa Centroamericana in 
 : 
 : 
 : 
 4th: 
7 – 26 July: 2017 CONCACAF Gold Cup in the 
 : 
 :

Youth 
18 January – 11 February: 2017 South American Youth Football Championship in 
 : 
 : 
 : 
 4th: 
11 – 24 February: 2017 OFC U-17 Championship in 
 : 
 : 
17 February – 5 March: 2017 CONCACAF U-20 Championship in 
 : 
 : 
23 February – 19 March: 2017 South American Under-17 Football Championship in 
 : 
 : 
 : 
 4th: 
26 February – 12 March: 2017 Africa U-20 Cup of Nations in 
 : 
 : 
 : 
 4th: 
21 April – 7 May: 2017 CONCACAF U-17 Championship in 
 : 
 : 
3 May – 19 May: 2017 UEFA European Under-17 Championship in 
 : 
 : 
14 – 28 May: 2017 Africa U-17 Cup of Nations in 
: 
: 
: 
 4th: 
20 May – 11 June: 2017 FIFA U-20 World Cup in 
 : 
 : 
 : 
 4th: 
16 – 30 June: 2017 UEFA European Under-21 Championship in 
 : 
 : 
2 – 15 July: 2017 UEFA European Under-19 Championship in 
 : 
 : 
18 – 27 September: 2017 SAFF U-18 Championship in 
 : 
 : 
 : 
 4th: 
6 – 28 October: 2017 FIFA U-17 World Cup in 
 : 
 : 
 : 
 4th:

Women's
16 July – 6 August: UEFA Women's Euro 2017 in the 
 : 
 : 
8 – 16 December: 2017 EAFF E-1 Football Championship (women) in 
 : 
 : 
 : 
 4th:

Women's youth
2 – 14 May: 2017 UEFA Women's Under-17 Championship in the 
 : 
 : 
8 – 20 August: 2017 UEFA Women's Under-19 Championship in 
 : 
 : 
10 – 23 September: 2017 AFC U-16 Women's Championship in 
 : 
 : 
 : 
 4th: 
14 – 28 October: 2017 AFC U-19 Women's Championship in 
 : 
 : 
 : 
 4th:

Multi-sport events

Men's
 14–29 August: Southeast Asian Games in 
 : 
 : 
 : 
4th:

Women's
 15–24 August: Southeast Asian Games in 
 : 
 : 
 : 
4th:

News 
 February 3 – CAS rejected the request for provisional measures made by Jeonbuk Hyundai Motors in relation to the club's entry into the 2017 AFC Champions League.

Fixed dates for national team matches 
Scheduled international matches per their International Match Calendar. Also known as FIFA International Day/Date(s).
20–28 March
5–13 June
28 August – 5 September
2–10 October
6–14 November

Club continental champions

Men

Notes

Women

Domestic leagues

UEFA

AFC

CAF

CONCACAF

CONMEBOL

OFC

Domestic cups
In all tables below, the "title" and "last honor" refer to each cup winner's record in that specific cup competition.

AFC

UEFA

CAF

CONCACAF

CONMEBOL

Women's leagues

UEFA

Notes

 England is not holding an official women's championship in 2017. The FA is returning top-flight women's football to the autumn-to-spring season that had prevailed prior to the establishment of the WSL, which started play in 2011 under a spring-to-autumn format. To that effect, a one-off FA WSL Spring Series will be held in spring 2017.

AFC

CONCACAF

Women's cups

UEFA

Detailed results

FIFA

 May 20 – June 11: 2017 FIFA U-20 World Cup in 
  defeated , 1–0, to win their first FIFA U-20 World Cup title.  took third place.
 June 17 – July 2: 2017 FIFA Confederations Cup in 
  defeated , 1–0, to win their first FIFA Confederations Cup title.  took third place.
 October 6 – 28: 2017 FIFA U-17 World Cup in 
  defeated , 5–2, to win their first FIFA U-17 World Cup title.  took third place.
 December 6 – 16: 2017 FIFA Club World Cup in the 
  Real Madrid defeated  Grêmio, 1–0, to win their second consecutive and third overall FIFA Club World Cup title.
  Pachuca took third place.

Europe (UEFA)

Nations
Men's events:
 May 3 – 19: 2017 UEFA European Under-17 Championship in 
  defeated , 4–1 in penalties and after a 2–2 score in regular play, to win their ninth UEFA European Under-17 Championship title.
 June 16 – 30: 2017 UEFA European Under-21 Championship in 
  defeated , 1–0, to win their second UEFA European Under-21 Championship title.
 July 2 – 15: 2017 UEFA European Under-19 Championship in 
  defeated , 2–1, to win their tenth UEFA European Under-19 Championship title.

Women's events:
 May 2 – 14: 2017 UEFA Women's Under-17 Championship in the 
  defeated , 3–1 in penalties and after a 0–0 score in regular play, to win their second consecutive and sixth overall UEFA Women's Under-17 Championship title.
 July 16 – August 6: UEFA Women's Euro 2017 in the 
 The  defeated , 4–2, to win their first UEFA Women's Euro title. 
 August 8 – 20: 2017 UEFA Women's Under-19 Championship in 
  defeated , 3–2, to win their second UEFA Women's Under-19 Championship title.

University event:
 July 23 – 30: 2017 European Universities Football Championships in  Porto
 Men:  Kuban State University defeated  University of Lille, 2–1, in the final.
  University of Bordeaux took third place.
 Women:  University of Montpellier defeated  University of Valencia, 7–1, in the final.
  Paul Sabatier University took third place.

Clubs
Men's events:
 September 13, 2016 – June 3, 2017: 2016–17 UEFA Champions League (final in  Cardiff)
  Real Madrid C.F. defeated  Juventus F.C., 4–1, to win their second consecutive and 12th overall UEFA Champions League title and the first football team to do this since the new updated form of the UEFA Champions League.
 Note: Real Madrid would represent UEFA at the 2017 FIFA Club World Cup.
 September 15, 2016 – May 24, 2017: 2016–17 UEFA Europa League (final in  Stockholm)
  Manchester United F.C. defeated  AFC Ajax, 2–0, to win their first UEFA Europa League title.
 July 1 – 9: 2017 UEFA Regions' Cup Final Tournament in  Istanbul
  Nogometno središte Zagreb defeated  Munster/Connacht, 1–0, to win their first UEFA Regions' Cup title.
 Singapore -> Champions:  Internazionale; Second:  FC Bayern Munich; Third:  Chelsea F.C.
 August 8: 2017 UEFA Super Cup in  Skopje
  Real Madrid C.F. defeated  Manchester United F.C., 2–1, to win their fourth UEFA Super Cup title.

Women's events:
 October 5, 2016 – June 1, 2017: 2016–17 UEFA Women's Champions League (final in  Cardiff)
  Lyon defeated fellow French team Paris Saint-Germain in the final 7–6 on penalties, following a 0–0 score at the end of extra time. Lyon won their second consecutive and fourth overall UEFA Women's Champions League title.

Youth events:
 September 13, 2016 – April 24, 2017: 2016–17 UEFA Youth League (final in  Nyon)
  FC Red Bull Salzburg defeated  Benfica, 2–1, to win their first UEFA Youth League title.

North, Central America & Caribbean (CONCACAF)

 August 2, 2016 – April 26, 2017: 2016–17 CONCACAF Champions League
  C.F. Pachuca defeated fellow Mexican team, Tigres UANL, 2–1 on aggregate, to win their fifth CONCACAF Champions League title.
 Note: Pachuca would represent CONCACAF at the 2017 FIFA Club World Cup.
 January 13 – 22: 2017 Copa Centroamericana in 
  won the round-robin competition with four wins and one draw, in order to win their fourth Copa Centroamericana title.
 Note: Along with Honduras, and  all qualified to compete at the 2017 CONCACAF Gold Cup.
 February 17 – March 5: 2017 CONCACAF U-20 Championship in 
  defeated , 5–3 in penalties and after a 0–0 score in regular play, to win their first CONCACAF U-20 Championship title.
 Note: Along with the two teams mentioned here, and  all qualified to compete at the 2017 FIFA U-20 World Cup.
 April 21 – May 7: 2017 CONCACAF U-17 Championship in 
 Note: Along with the two teams mentioned here,  and  all qualified to compete at the 2017 FIFA U-17 World Cup.
 June 22 & 25: 2017 Caribbean Cup in  Martinique
  defeated , 2–1, to win their first Caribbean Cup title.
  took third place.
 July 7 – 26: 2017 CONCACAF Gold Cup in the 
 The  defeated , 2–1, to win their sixth CONCACAF Gold Cup title.

South America (CONMEBOL)

 January 18 – February 11: 2017 South American Youth Football Championship in 
 Champions: ; Second: ; Third: ; Fourth: 
 Note: All the teams mentioned above all qualify to compete in the 2017 FIFA U-20 World Cup.
 January 23 – November 29: 2017 Copa Libertadores
  Grêmio defeated  Lanús, 3–1 on aggregate, to win their third Copa Libertadores title.
 Note: Grêmio would represent CONMEBOL at the 2017 FIFA Club World Cup.
 February 23 – March 19: 2017 South American Under-17 Football Championship in 
 Champions: ; Second: ;  Third: ; Fourth: 
 Note: All the teams mentioned above all qualify to compete in the 2017 FIFA U-17 World Cup.
 February 28 – December 13: 2017 Copa Sudamericana
  Independiente defeated  Flamengo, 3–2 on aggregate, to win their second Copa Sudamericana title.
 April 4 & May 10: 2017 Recopa Sudamericana
  Atlético Nacional defeated  Chapecoense, 5–3 on aggregate, to win their first Recopa Sudamericana title.
 August 15: 2017 Suruga Bank Championship in  Saitama
  Urawa Red Diamonds defeated  Chapecoense, 1–0, to win their first Suruga Bank Championship title.
 October 7 – 21: 2017 Copa Libertadores Femenina in 
  Corinthians–Audax defeated  Colo-Colo, 5–4 in penalties and after a 0–0 score in regular play, to win their first Copa Libertadores Femenina title.
  River Plate took third place.
 November 4 – 19: 2017 South American Under-15 Football Championship in 
  defeated , 3–2, to win their first South American Under-15 Football Championship title.

Africa (CAF)

 January 14 – February 5: 2017 Africa Cup of Nations in 
  defeated , 2–1, to win their fifth Africa Cup of Nations title.  took third place.
 Note: Cameroon has qualified to compete at the 2017 FIFA Confederations Cup.
 February 10 – November 4: 2017 CAF Champions League
  Wydad Casablanca defeated  Al Ahly, to win their second CAF Champions League title.
 Note: Wydad Casablanca would represent the CAF at the 2017 FIFA Club World Cup.
 February 10 – November 25: 2017 CAF Confederation Cup
  TP Mazembe defeated  SuperSport United F.C., 2–1 on aggregate, to win their second consecutive CAF Confederation Cup title.
 February 18: 2017 CAF Super Cup
  Mamelodi Sundowns F.C. defeated  TP Mazembe, 1–0, to win their first CAF Super Cup title.
 February 26 – March 12: 2017 Africa U-20 Cup of Nations in 
  defeated , 2–0, to win their first Africa U-20 Cup of Nations title.  took third place.
 Note: Along with the three teams mentioned above,  have qualified to compete at the 2017 FIFA U-20 World Cup.
 May 14 – 28: 2017 Africa U-17 Cup of Nations in 
  defeated , 1–0, to win their second consecutive Africa U-17 Cup of Nations title.
  took third place.
 June 25 – July 9: 2017 COSAFA Cup in  Moruleng and Phokeng
  defeated , 3–1, to win their fifth COSAFA Cup title.
  took third place.
 September 9 – 24: 2017 WAFU Cup of Nations in 
  defeated , 4–1, to win their second consecutive WAFU Cup of Nations title.
  took third place.
 December 3 – 17: 2017 CECAFA Cup in 
  defeated , 3–2 in penalties and after a 2–2 score in regular play, to win their seventh CECAFA Cup title.
  took third place.
 December 6 – 16: 2017 COSAFA U-20 Cup in 
  defeated , 2–1, to win their seventh COSAFA U-20 Cup title.
  took third place.
 July 21, 2017 – January 28, 2018: 2018 African U-20 Women's World Cup Qualifying Tournament

Asia (AFC)

 January 24 – November 4: 2017 AFC Cup
  Al-Quwa Al-Jawiya defeated  Istiklol, 1–0, to win their second consecutive AFC Cup title. 
 January 24 – November 25: 2017 AFC Champions League
  Urawa Red Diamonds defeated  Al-Hilal FC, 2–1 on aggregate, to win their second AFC Champions League title.
 Note: Urawa Red Diamonds would represent the AFC at the 2017 FIFA Club World Cup.
 July 9 – 22: 2017 AFF U-15 Youth Championship in 
  defeated , 4–2 in penalties and after a 0–0 score in regular play, to win their third AFF U-15 Youth Championship title.
  took third place.
 September 4 – 17: 2017 AFF U-18 Youth Championship in  Yangon
  defeated , 2–0, to win their fifth AFF U-19 Youth Championship title.
  took third place.
 September 9 – 23: 2017 AFC U-16 Women's Championship in 
  defeated , 2–0, to win their second consecutive and third overall AFC U-16 Women's Championship title.
  took third place.
 Note: All three teams here have qualified to compete at the 2018 FIFA U-17 Women's World Cup.
 October 14 – 28: 2017 AFC U-19 Women's Championship in 
  defeated , 1–0, to win their second consecutive and fifth overall AFC U-19 Women's Championship title.
  took third place.
 December 8 – 16: 2017 EAFF E-1 Football Championship for Men and Women in 
 Men:  defeated , 4–1, to win their fourth men's EAFF E-1 Football Championship title.
  took third place.
 Women:  defeated , 2–0, to win their third consecutive women's EAFF E-1 Football Championship title.
  took third place.
 December 22, 2017 – January 8, 2018: 23rd Arabian Gulf Cup in

Oceania (OFC)

 February 11 – 24: 2017 OFC U-17 Championship in 
  defeated , 7–0, to win their sixth consecutive and seventh overall OFC U-17 Championship title.
 Note: The two teams mentioned above have qualified to compete at the 2017 FIFA U-17 World Cup.
 February 25 – May 7: 2017 OFC Champions League
  Auckland City FC defeated fellow New Zealand team, Team Wellington, 5–0 on aggregate, to win their seventh consecutive and ninth overall OFC Champions League title.
 Note: Auckland City would represent the OFC at the 2017 FIFA Club World Cup.
 July 11 – 24: 2017 OFC U-19 Women's Championship in 
 Champions: ; Second: ; Third: 
 Note: New Zealand has qualified to compete at the 2018 FIFA U-20 Women's World Cup.
 August 4 – 18: 2017 OFC U-16 Women's Championship in  Apia
  defeated , 6–0, to win their fourth consecutive OFC U-16 Women's Championship title.
 Note: New Zealand has qualified to compete at the 2018 FIFA U-17 Women's World Cup.

Futsal

AFC
 May 16 – 26: 2017 AFC U-20 Futsal Championship in  Bangkok
 In the final,  defeated , 2–0, to win their 1st AFC U-20 Futsal Championship.  took third place.
 July 3 – 9: 2017 AFF Futsal Club Championship in  Bangkok
 In the final,  Thai Port defeated  Sanna Khanh Hoa, 4–0, to win their 3rd title.  Melaka United took third place.
 July 20 – 30: 2017 AFC Futsal Club Championship in  Ho Chi Minh City
 In the final,  Chonburi Bluewave defeated  Giti Pasand Isfahan, 3–2, to win their 2nd title.  Thái Sơn Nam took third place.
 October 23 – November 3: 2017 AFF Futsal Championship in  Ho Chi Minh City

CONCACAF
 August 21 – 26: 2017 CONCACAF Futsal Club Championship in  Tegucigalpa
 In the final,  Grupo Line Futsal defeated  Elite Futsal, 5–4, to win their 1st CONCACAF Futsal Club Championship.  Soyapango F.C. took third place.

CONMEBOL
 April 5 – 12: 2017 Copa América de Futsal in  San Juan
 In the final,  defeated , 4–2, after , to win their 10th Copa América de Futsal.  took third place.
 May 22 – 28: 2017 Copa Libertadores de Futsal in  Lima
 In the final,  Carlos Barbosa defeated  Cerro Porteño, 2–1, to win their 5th Copa Libertadores de Futsal.  Bello Real Antioquia took third place.
 July 15 – 22: 3rd CONMEBOL Women Futsal Club Championships in  Asunción
 In the final,  Associação Unochapecó/Female Futsal defeated  Club Sport Colonial, 4–2, to win their 2nd CONMEBOL Women Futsal Club Championships.  Trujillanos FC took third place.
 August 16 – 20: 2017 Liga Sudamericana de Futsal (South zone) in  Buenos Aires
 U19: Round Robin: 1st: , 2nd: , 3rd: , 4th: , 5th: 
 Seniors: Round Robin: 1st: , 2nd: , 3rd: , 4th: , 5th:

UEFA
 April 28 – 30: 2016–17 UEFA Futsal Cup (final four) in  Almaty
 In the final,  Inter FS defeated  Sporting CP, 7–0, to win their 4th UEFA Futsal Cup.  AFC Kairat took third place.

EUSA
 July 10 – 17: 11th European Universities Futsal Championship in  Çorum
 Men's:  University of Beira Interior defeated  Tbilisi State University, 5–4.  University of Porto took third place.
 Women's: League system: 1st.:  Moscow Polytechnic University, 2nd:  University of Zagreb, 3rd:  University of Münster

Beach soccer

International beach soccer events
 January 9 – 15: 2016 Copa Libertadores de Beach Soccer in  Santos, São Paulo (debut event)
  CR Vasco da Gama defeated  Club Atlético Rosario Central, 8–1, in the final.
  Deportes Iquique took third place.
 February 5 – 12: 2017 CONMEBOL Beach Soccer Championship in  Asunción
  defeated , 7–5, in the final.  took third place.
 Note: All these teams mentioned above all qualify to compete at the 2017 FIFA Beach Soccer World Cup.''
 February 13 – 16: Thailand 5s Beach Soccer Championship 2017 in  Bangkok
  defeated , 6–3, in the final.  took third place.
 February 14 – 16: Persian Beach Soccer Cup 2017 in  Bushehr
 Champions: ; Second: ;  Third: 
 February 20 – 26: 2017 CONCACAF Beach Soccer Championship in  Nassau
  defeated , 4–2, in the final.  took third place.
 March 4 – 11: 2017 AFC Beach Soccer Championship in  Kuala Terengganu
  defeated , 7–2, in the final.  took third place.
 March 27 – 29: Eurasia Beach Soccer Cup 2017 in  Yazd
 Champions:  Moghaevmate Golsapoosh; Second:  Lokomotiv Moscow; Third:  Sporting Clube de Portugal
 April 13 – 15: Copa Pílsener Fútbol Playa El Salvador 2017 at the  Salvadoran Costa del Sol
 Champions: ; Second: ; Third: ; Fourth: 
 April 21 – 23: 2017 Tulip Festival Beach Soccer Tournament in  Istanbul (debut event)
 Champions: ; Second: ; Third: ; Fourth: 
 April 27 – May 7: 2017 FIFA Beach Soccer World Cup in  Nassau
  defeated , 6–0, to win their 14th FIFA Beach Soccer World Cup title.
  took third place.
 May 19 – 21: Sal Beach Soccer Cup 2017 in  Sal, Cape Verde
 Champions: ; Second: ; Third: ; Fourth: 
 May 19 – 21: Beach Soccer USA Cup 2017 in  Oceanside, California
 Champions:  Fortaleza Esporte Clube; Runner-Up:  Botafogo
 May 29 – June 4: Euro Winners Cup 2017 for Men and Women in  Nazaré, Portugal
 Men:  S.C. Braga defeated  Artur Music, 8–5, in the final.  Lokomotiv Moscow took third place.
 Women:  BSC Havana Shots Aargau defeated  Portsmouth Ladies BSC, 4–3, in the final.  Higicontrol Melilla took third place.
 June 9 – 11: NASSC - US Open 2017 in  Virginia Beach, Virginia
  FC Barcelona defeated  Gobeachsoccer, 6–1, in the final.  Great Lakes BSC took third place.
 June 16 – 18: Talent Beach Soccer Tournament Siófok 2017 in 
  defeated , 13–4, in the final.  took third place.
 June 30 – July 2: Friendship Cup 2017 in  Vitebsk
 Champions: ; Second: ; Third: ; Fourth: 
 July 14 – 16: Morocco Beach Soccer Cup 2017 in  Casablanca
 Champions: ; Second: ; Third: ; Fourth: 
 July 15 & 16: Nations Cup 2017 - Linz in 
  defeated , 6–2, in the final. The  took third place.
 July 19 – 22: Commonwealth Youth Games - Beach Soccer in  Nassau, Bahamas
 Men:  ;  ;  
 Women:  ;  ;  
 July 21 – 23: BSWW Mundialito Cascais 2017 in 
 Champions: ; Second: ; Third: ; Fourth: 
 September 12 – 23: Liga Sudamericana Fútbol Playa CONMEBOL 2017 in  Pimentel District &  Asunción (debut event)
 October 20 – 22: BSWW Tour - Visit Puerto Vallarta Cup 2017 in 
 Champions: ; Second: ; Third: ; Fourth: 
 October 31 – November 4: Intercontinental Beach Soccer Cup Dubai 2017 in the 
 Champions: ; Second: ; Third: 
 November 4: Beach Soccer Stars 2017 in  Dubai
 For the list of winners, click here.
 November 11 – 19: 2017 Copa Libertadores de Beach Soccer in  Lambaré
  CR Vasco da Gama defeated  Club Malvín, 8–5, in the final.
  Universidad Autónoma de Asunción took third place.
 December 3 – 10: 2017 CONMEBOL Campeonato Sudamericano Sub-20 Futbol Playa in 
 Champions: ; Second: ; Third: ; Fourth: 
 December 8 – 10: BSWW Tour - Copa Lagos 2017 in 
 Division A Champions: ; Second: ; Third: ; Fourth: 
 Division B Champions:  Arsenal BSC; Second:  Kebbi BSC; Third:  Gidi Sharks; Fourth:  Pepsi Football Academy
 December 14 – 17: Mundialito de Clubes 2017 in  Vargem Grande Paulista
  BSC Lokomotiv Moscow defeated  Pars Jonoubi, 5–4, in the final.
  SC Corinthians Paulista took third place.

2017 Euro Beach Soccer League
 June 23 – 25: EBSL #1 in  Belgrade
 Division "A" Champions: ; Second: ; Third: ; Fourth: 
 Division "B" Champions: ; Second: ; Third: ; Fourth: 
 July 7 – 9: EBSL #2 in  Nazaré
 Men's Division A Champions:  (Group 1);  (Group 2)
 Women's Champions:  defeated , 4–3, in the final. The  took third place.
 July 28 – 30: EBSL #3 in  Moscow
 Division "A" Champions: ; Second: ; Third: ; Fourth: 
 Division "B" Champions: ; Second: ; Third: 
 August 11 – 13: EBSL #4 in  Siófok
 Division "A" Champions: ; Second: ; Third: ; Fourth: 
 Division "B" Champions: ; Second: ; Third: ; Fourth: 
 August 25 – 27: EBSL #5 in  Warnemünde
 Division "A" Champions: ; Second: ; Third: ; Fourth: 
 Division "B" Champions: ; Second: ; Third: ; Fourth: 
 September 14 – 17: 2017 EBSL Superfinal and Promotion Final in  Terracina
 Superfinal:  defeated , 3–1, to win their fifth Euro Beach Soccer League title.
  took third place.
 Promotional final:  defeated , 4–2, to be promoted to the EBSL's Division A.
  took third place.

Deaths

January 

 1 January – Moruca, Spanish footballer (b. 1932)
 2 January – Viktor Tsaryov, Russian footballer (b. 1931)
 3 January – Enzo Benedetti, Italian footballer (b. 1931)
 4 January
 Ezio Pascutti, Italian international footballer (b. 1937)
 Paul Went, English footballer (b. 1949)
 5 January
 Graham Atkinson, English footballer (b. 1943)
 Harry Taylor, English footballer (b. 1935)
 6 January – Yaron Ben-Dov, Israeli footballer (b. 1970)
 7 January – Laurie Topp, English international footballer (b. 1923)
 8 January – Zacharie Noah, Cameroonian footballer (b. 1937)
 9 January – Roberto Cabañas, Paraguayan international footballer (b. 1961)
 10 January – Achmad Kurniawan, Indonesian footballer (b. 1979)
 11 January – François Van der Elst, Belgian international footballer (b. 1954)
 12 January – Graham Taylor, English footballer (b. 1944)
 15 January – Kozo Kinomoto, Japanese footballer (b. 1949)
 16 January – Amin Nasir, Singaporean footballer
 19 January
 Ger van Mourik, Dutch footballer (b. 1931)
 Giovanni Vastola, Italian footballer (born 1938)
 21 January
 Marc Baecke, Belgian footballer (born 1956)
 Dave Shipperley, English footballer (born 1952)
 24 January
 Fred André, Dutch footballer (born 1941)
 Carlos Verdejo, Chilean footballer (born 1934)
 25 January – Ivan Pritargov, Bulgarian footballer (born 1952)
 26 January
 Lindy Delapenha, Jamaican footballer (born 1927)
 Miikka Toivola, Finnish footballer (born 1949)
 Michael Tönnies, German footballer (born 1959)
 27 January
 Wim Anderiesen Jr., Dutch footballer (born 1931)
 Tatiana Repeikina, Russian footballer (born 1973).
 Billy Simpson, Northern Irish footballer (born 1929)
 29 January
 Ruslan Barburoș, Moldovan footballer (born 1978)
 Pat Corr, Northern Irish footballer (born 1927)
 Willy Fossli, Norwegian footballer (born 1931)

February 

 1 February
 Constantin Dinulescu, Romanian footballer (born 1931)
 Cor van der Hoeven, Dutch footballer (born 1921)
 2 February
 Shunichiro Okano, Japanese international footballer, coach, and President of Japan Football Association (born 1931)
 Miltos Papapostolou, Greek footballer (born 1936)
 4 February – Hans van der Hoek, Dutch international footballer (born 1933)
 8 February – Viktor Chanov, Ukrainian footballer (born 1959)
 9 February – Piet Keizer, Dutch international footballer (born 1943)
 11 February – Juan Ulloa, Costa Rican footballer (born 1935)
 12 February 
 Sam Arday, Ghanaian football manager (born 1945)
 Bobby Murdoch, English footballer (born 1936)
 14 February – Ríkharður Jónsson, Icelandic international footballer (born 1929)
 15 February
 Manfred Kaiser, East-German international footballer (born 1929)
 Roy Proverbs, English footballer (born 1932)
 16 February – Bengt Gustavsson, Swedish international footballer and manager (born 1928)
 18 February
 Roger Hynd, Scottish footballer (born 1942)
 Henk Nienhuis, Dutch footballer (born 1941)
 19 February
 Shibaji Banerjee, Indian footballer
 Paul McCarthy, Irish footballer (born 1971)
 Roman Zhuravskyi, Ukrainian footballer (born 1948)
 25 February – Bobby Lumley, English footballer (born 1933)
 27 February
 Marcel De Corte, Belgian footballer (born 1929)
 Zvjezdan Cvetković, Yugoslavian international footballer und Croatian Serb manager (born 1960)
 Alex Young, Scottish international footballer (born 1937)

March 

 2 March
 Tarcisio Catanese, Italian footballer (born 1967)
 Édouard Close, 87, Belgian politician, Burgemeester of Liège (1976–1991).
 Tommy Gemmell, Scottish international footballer and manager (born 1943)
 3 March – Raymond Kopa, French international footballer (born 1931)
 4 March – Alberto Villalta, Salvadorian footballer (born 1947)
 6 March – Marek Ostrowski, Polish international footballer (born 1959)
 7 March – Juan Carlos Touriño, Spanish international footballer (born 1944)
 12 March – Dave Taylor, English footballer (born 1940)
 13 March – Hiroto Muraoka, Japanese footballer (born 1931)
 14 March
 Paul Bowles English footballer (born 1957)
 Jim McAnearney, English footballer (born 1935)
 16 March – Arne Høivik, Norwegian international footballer (born 1932)
 19 March – Ryan McBride, Northern Irish footballer (born 1989)
 22 March
 Ken Currie, Scottish footballer (born 1925)
 Ronnie Moran, English footballer (born 1934)
 24 March – Wolfgang Solz, German international footballer (born 1940)
 25 March – Asbjørn Hansen, Norwegian footballer (born 1930)
 26 March – Vladimir Kazachyonok, Soviet international footballer and Russian coach (born 1952)
 27 March 
 Romolo Bizzotto, Italian footballer (born 1925)
 Eduard Mudrik, Soviet Russian international footballer (born 1939)

April 

 1 April – Stuart Markland, Scottish footballer (born 1948)
 4 April – Karl Stotz, Austrian international footballer and manager (born 1927)
 10 April – Fred Furniss, English footballer (born 1922)
 15 April – Amílcar Henríquez, Panamaian international footballer (born 1983)
 16 April – Spartaco Landini, Italian footballer (born 1944)
 18 April – Mihalj Mesaroš, Serbian footballer (born 1935)
 20 April – Roberto Ferreiro, Argentine international footballer and manager (born 1935)
 21 April – Ugo Ehiogu, English international footballer and coach (born 1972)
 23 April – František Rajtoral, Czech international footballer (born 1986)
 26 April – Moïse Brou Apanga, Gabonese international footballer (born 1982)
 27 April – Nikolai Arefyev, Russian footballer (born 1979)

May 

 2 May – Cammy Duncan, Scottish footballer (born 1965)
 6 May
 Tony Conwell, English footballer (born 1932)
 Peter Noble, English footballer (born 1944)
 7 May: Eduard Gutiérrez, Colombian footballer (born 1995)
 8 May: Ulugbek Ruzimov, Uzbekistani footballer (born 1968)
 13 May:
 Yanko Daucik, Czech footballer (born 1941)
 Rachid Natouri, Algerian footballer (born 1946)
 16 May: Ronnie Cocks, Maltese footballer (born 1943)
 17 May:
 Raúl Córdoba, Mexican international footballer (born 1924)
 Todor Veselinović, Serbian footballer (born 1930)
 18 May:
 Volodymyr Dudarenko, Soviet footballer (born 1946)
 Eric Stevenson, Scottish footballer (born 1942)
 19 May:
 David Bystroň, Czech footballer (born 1982)
 Corbett Cresswell, English footballer (born 1932)
 Tommy Ross, Scottish footballer (born 1946)
 20 May:
 Recep Adanır, Turkish footballer (born 1929)
 Noel Kinsey, Welsh footballer (born 1925)
 22 May: Oscar Fulloné, Argentine footballer (born 1939)
 25 May: Emili Vicente, Spanish footballer (born 1965)
 27 May: Ludwig Preis, German football coach (born 1971)
 30 May:
 Dibyo Previan Caesario, Indonesian footballer (born 1992)
 Robert Hammond, Ghanaian footballer

June 

 5 June:
 Marcos Coll, Colombian footballer (born 1935)
 Giuliano Sarti, Italian international footballer (born 1933)
 Cheick Tioté, Ivorian footballer (born 1986)
 7 June: Ernie Edds, English footballer (born 1926)
 8 June:
 Václav Halama, Czech footballer (born 1940)
 Sergo Kutivadze, Georgian footballer (born 1944)
 Jan Notermans, Dutch footballer (born 1932)
 12 June:
 Pessalli, Brazilian footballer (born 1990)
 Karl-Heinz Weigang, German footballer (born 1935)
 14 June: Jacques Foix, French international footballer (born 1930)
 16 June:
 Edzai Kasinauyo, Zimbabwean footballer (born 1975)
 Günter Siebert, German footballer (born 1930)
 18 June: Albert Franks, English footballer (born 1936)
 20 June: Frode Larsen, Norwegian footballer (born 1949)
 21 June: Kelechi Emeteole, Nigerian footballer (born 1951)
 23 June: Tonny van der Linden, Dutch footballer (born 1932)
 25 June: José Manuel Mourinho Félix, Portuguese footballer (born 1938)
 27 June: Stéphane Paille, French footballer (born 1965)
 28 June: John Higgins, Scottish footballer (born 1930)
 30 June: László Kovács, Hungarian footballer (born 1951)

July 

 1 July:
 Ibra Agbo, Equatoguinean footballer (born 1987)
 Ayan Sadakov, Bulgarian footballer (born 1961)
 2 July:
 Billy Cook, Australian footballer (born 1940)
 John McCormick, Scottish footballer (born 1936)
 4 July: Ntuthuko Radebe, South African footballer (born 1994)
 5 July: John McKenzie, Scottish footballer (born 1925)
 6 July:
 Heinz Schneiter, Swiss footballer and manager (born 1935)
 Ken Wimshurst, English footballer (born 1938)
 7 July:
 Ray Barnard, English footballer (born 1933)
 Johnson Kendrick, Brazilian footballer (born 1992)
 Tony Moore, English footballer (born 1947)
 8 July: Roy Richards, Vincentian footballer (born 1983)
 10 July: Eugène Koffi Kouamé, Ivorian footballer (born 1988)
 11 July: Gert Trinklein, German footballer (born 1949)
 14 July: Bert Hill, English footballer (1930)
 15 July:
 Josef Hamerl, Austrian footballer (born 1931)
 Davie Laing, Scottish footballer (born 1925)
 19 July: Joe Walters, Scottish footballer (born 1935)
 22 July: Marcel Kunz, Swiss footballer (born 1943)
 23 July: Waldir Peres, Brazilian footballer (born 1951)
 26 July:
 Maxlei dos Santos Luzia, Brazilian footballer (born 1975)
 Jimmy White, English footballer (born 1942)
 27 July:
 Perivaldo Dantas, Brazilian footballer (born 1953)
 Abdelmajid Dolmy, Moroccan footballer (born 1953)
 Valeri Maslov, Russian footballer (born 1940)
 Ovidio Messa, Bolivian footballer (born 1952)
 Manfred Rummel, German footballer (born 1938)

August 

 2 August:
 Dave Caldwell, Scottish footballer (born 1932)
 Ely Tacchella, Swiss footballer (born 1936)
 5 August: Joe Cilia, Maltese footballer (born 1937)
 7 August: Tor Røste Fossen, Norwegian footballer (born 1940)
 9 August: Beethoven Javier, Uruguayan footballer (born 1940)
 10 August:
 Miroslav Ćurčić, Serbian footballer (born 1962)
 Alois Eisenträger, German footballer (born 1927)
 15 August: Joe McGurn, Scottish footballer (born 1965)
 16 August: John Ogston, Scottish footballer (born 1939)
 18 August: Pertti Alaja, Finnish footballer (born 1952)
 21 August: Bill Green, English footballer (born 1950)
 23 August: Engelbert Jarek, Polish footballer (born 1935)
 24 August: Alan Boswell, English footballer (born 1943)
 26 August: Dave Bumpstead, English footballer (born 1935)
 30 August: Elmer Acevedo, Salvadoran footballer (born 1949)

September 

 3 September: Piet Ouderland, Dutch footballer (born 1933)
 6 September: Nicolae Lupescu, Romanian footballer (born 1940)
 8 September: Humberto Rosa, Argentine-Italian footballer (born 1932)
 12 September: Bert McCann, Scottish footballer (born 1932)
 13 September: Derek Wilkinson, English footballer (born 1935)
 14 September: Wim Huis, Dutch footballer (born 1927)
 17 September: Eugenio Bersellini, Italian footballer (born 1936)
 18 September:
 Jean Plaskie, Belgian international footballer (born 1941)
 Zurab Sotkilava, Georgian-Russian footballer (born 1937)
 Paul Wilson, Scottish footballer (born 1950)
 22 September: John Worsdale, English footballer (born 1948)
 26 September: Richard Boucher, French footballer (born 1932)
 28 September:
 Aleksey Arifullin, Russian footballer (born 1970)
 Željko Perušić, Croatian footballer (born 1936)
 29 September: Rolf Herings, German football coach (born 1940)
 30 September: Gunnar Thoresen, Norwegian footballer (born 1920)

October 

 1 October: Olivier Baudry, French footballer (born 1973)
 2 October: Patrocinio Samudio, Paraguayan footballer (born 1975)
 3 October: Les Mutrie, English footballer (born 1951)
 5 October: Georges Griffiths, Ivorian footballer (born 1990)
 6 October: Roberto Anzolin, Italian footballer (born 1938)
 7 October: Konstantin Sarsania, Russian footballer, manager and agent (born 1968)
 8 October: 
 Michel Fernando Costa, Brazilian footballer (born 1981)
 Mlondi Dlamini, South African footballer (born 1997)
 9 October:
 Jimmy Reid, Scottish footballer (born 1935)
 József Tóth, Hungarian footballer (born 1929)
 11 October: Dick Hewitt, English footballer (born 1943)
 13 October: Pierre Hanon, Belgian footballer (born 1936)
 15 October: Choirul Huda, Indonesian footballer (born 1979)
 17 October: Giuseppe Massa, Italian footballer (born 1948)
 19 October: Brian Riley, English footballer (born 1937)
 24 October: Ebrahim Ashtiani, Iranian footballer (born 1942)
 27 October: Abdoulaye Soulama, Burkinabé footballer (born 1979)
 28 October: Viktor Karachun, Russian footballer (born 1959)
 30 October: Eugène Parlier, Swiss footballer (born 1929)
 31 October:
 Stefano Salvatori, Italian footballer (born 1967)
 Abubakari Yakubu, Ghanaian footballer (born 1981)

November 

 1 November: Ramón Cabrero, Argentinian footballer and coach (born 1947)
 2 November: Costanzo Balleri, Italian footballer (born 1933)
 4 November: Tallys Machado de Oliveira, Brazilian footballer (born 1987)
 5 November:
 Erlandas Duršlikas, Lithuanian footballer (born 1998)
 Dionatan Teixeira, Slovak footballer (born 1992)
 6 November:
 Günter Hoge, German footballer (born 1940)
 Feliciano Rivilla, Spanish footballer (born 1936)
 7 November: Hans Schäfer, German footballer (born 1927)
 8 November: Josip Weber, Croatian-Belgian footballer (born 1964)
 9 November: Akbar Eftekhari, Iranian footballer (born 1943)
 11 November:
 Nate Hobgood-Chittick, American footballer (born 1974)
 Amar Rouaï, Algerian footballer (born 1932)
 12 November: Santiago Vernazza, Argentine footballer (born 1928)
 13 November: Frank O'Connor, Australian footballer (born 1923)
 15 November:
 Hamad Ndikumana, Rwandan footballer (born 1978)
 Bert Ormond, New Zealand footballer (born 1931)
 16 November: Tommy Farrer, English footballer (born 1922)
 18 November:
 Commins Menapi, Solomon Islands footballer (born 1977)
 Friedel Rausch, German footballer (born 1940)
 20 November: Janusz Wójcik, Polish footballer (born 1953)
 21 November: Luis Garisto, Uruguayan footballer (born 1945)
 22 November: Otto Luttrop, German footballer (born 1939)
 23 November: Allan Harris, English footballer (born 1942)
 24 November: Ángel Berni, Paraguayan footballer (born 1931)
 26 November: Eliezer Spiegel, Israeli footballer (born 1922)
 27 November: Dermot Drummy, English footballer (1961)
 28 November:
 Jimmy McEwan, Scottish footballer (born 1929)
 Zdeněk Šreiner, Czech footballer (born 1954)
 29 November: Ján Strausz, Slovak footballer (born 1942)

December

 3 December: Ian Twitchin, English footballer (born 1952)
 4 December:
 Henning Jensen, Danish footballer (born 1949)
 Gregory Rigters, Surinamese footballer (born 1985)
 5 December:
 Michel Dighneef, Belgian footballer (born 1936)
 Laurie Rymer, Australian footballer (1934)
 Jacques Simon, French footballer (born 1941)
 6 December: Juan José Díaz Galiana, Spanish football coach (born 1949)
 8 December: Pál Dárdai, Hungarian footballer (born 1951)
 9 December: Benjamin Massing, Cameroonian footballer (born 1962)
 10 December: Ivan Stoyanov, Bulgarian footballer (born 1949)
 11 December: Paul Holz, German footballer (born 1952)
 15 December:
 Dave Boyd, Australian footballer (born 1927)
 Felipe Mesones, Argentine footballer (born 1936)
 Paul Straney, Northern Irish footballer (born 1975)
 17 December:
 Higinio García Fernández, Spanish footballer (born 1956)
 Frank Hodgkin, Australian footballer (born 1941)
 18 December: Josef Pešice, Czech footballer (born 1950)
 19 December: Yevhen Kotelnykov, Ukrainian footballer (born 1939)
 20 December: Jiří Sloup, Czech footballer (born 1953)
 21 December:
 Zdzisław Bieniek, Polish footballer (born 1930)
 Renan Martins Pereira, Brazilian footballer (born 1997)
 Timur Segizbayev, Kazak footballer (born 1941)
 22 December:
 Cyril Beavon, English footballer (born 1937)
 Ken Hands, Australian footballer (born 1926)
 23 December: Cesare Zamboni, Italian footballer (born 1931)
 24 December:
 Ken Feltscheer, Australian footballer (born 1915)
 Edu Ferreira, Portuguese footballer (born 1997)
 Renato Marchiaro, Italian footballer (born 1919)
 26 December:
 Gerd Hennig, German football referee (born 1935)
 Willie Penman, Scottish footballer (born 1939)
 Steve Piper, English footballer (born 1953)
 27 December:
 Osvaldo Fattori, Italian footballer (born 1922)
 Roberto Ortega, Argentine footballer (born 1932)
 Lothar Schämer, German footballer (born 1940)
 28 December: Stanisław Terlecki, Polish footballer (born 1955)
 30 December:
 John Faulkner, English footballer (born 1948)
 Sean McCaffrey, Irish football manager (born 1959)

References

External links 

 
Association football by year